"Tonight" is a song by Raspberries, released in August 1973.  It was written by band leader Eric Carmen, who also provided the lead vocals. The song was the first of three single releases from their third LP, Side 3.

Reception

Cash Box called the song a "driving Eric Carmen composition that is destined to become the group's fourth successive chart item."

Chart performance
"Tonight" was the biggest hit from the album, reaching number 69 on the US Billboard Hot 100, and number 37 on Cash Box.  It also reached number 80 in Canada.

Weekly charts

Cover versions
"Tonight" was covered by Mötley Crüe in 1981.  It was an outtake from their album, Too Fast for Love.  The song was released in 1999, issued with the remastered 1999 and 2003 editions of the group's LP.

References

External links
 Song Lyrics
 
 

1973 singles
1973 songs
Raspberries (band) songs
Capitol Records singles
Songs written by Eric Carmen
Song recordings produced by Jimmy Ienner
Mötley Crüe songs